Sitarganj Legislative Assembly constituency is one of the seventy electoral Uttarakhand Legislative Assembly constituencies of Uttarakhand state in India.

Sitarganj Legislative Assembly constituency is a part of Nainital-Udhamsingh Nagar constituency.

Members of Legislative Assembly

Election results

2022

2017

See also
 Sitarganj
 List of constituencies of the Uttarakhand Legislative Assembly
 Udham Singh Nagar district

References

External links
  

Udham Singh Nagar district
Assembly constituencies of Uttarakhand